"Earthquake" is a single by British disc jockey DJ Fresh and American counterpart Diplo featuring vocals from Dominique Young Unique. The song was released in the United Kingdom on 18 August 2013 as the lead single from his fourth studio album. An edited version of the song with extra production and sound effects features in the film Kick-Ass 2, under the name "Motherquake". It contains a sample from the song "Teach Me How to Dougie" by the hip hop group Cali Swag District. "Earthquake" peaked at number four on the UK Singles Chart, number three on the UK Dance Chart and topped the UK Indie Chart.

The debut performance of "Earthquake" occurred during DJ Fresh's set at the New York leg of the international Electric Daisy Carnival festival. Dominique and DJ Fresh performed "Earthquake" again at Radio 1's Big Weekend, during the latter's headlining set on the "1Xtra Arena/In New Music We Trust Stage". DJ Fresh and Dominique Young Unique performed the track live on 4Music panel show 'McFlurry Music Mix Up' presented by Rickie and Melvin on 19 August 2013.

Music video
A music video to accompany the release of "Earthquake" was first released onto YouTube on 24 July 2013 at a total length of three minutes and twenty seconds. The music video was directed by Jonas & François and filmed in New York City. It features DJ Fresh, Diplo and Dominique Young Unique.

Track listings

Chart performance

Weekly charts

Year-end charts

Certifications

Release history

References

2013 singles
2013 songs
DJ Fresh songs
Dominique Young Unique songs
Songs written by Diplo
Song recordings produced by Diplo
Ministry of Sound singles
Song recordings produced by DJ Fresh
Songs written by DJ Fresh